François De Wael (10 November 1922 – 15 December 2006) was a Belgian footballer. He played in one match for the Belgium national football team in 1944.

References

External links
 

1922 births
2006 deaths
Belgian footballers
Belgium international footballers
Place of birth missing
Association football midfielders